Lynch Ipera (born 4 August 1976) is a Papua New Guinean boxer. He competed in the men's featherweight event at the 1996 Summer Olympics.

References

External links

1976 births
Living people
Papua New Guinean male boxers
Olympic boxers of Papua New Guinea
Boxers at the 1996 Summer Olympics
Boxers at the 1998 Commonwealth Games
Commonwealth Games bronze medallists for Papua New Guinea
Commonwealth Games medallists in boxing
Place of birth missing (living people)
Featherweight boxers
Medallists at the 1998 Commonwealth Games